Pownal Center is an unincorporated community and census-designated place (CDP) in the town of Pownal, Bennington County, Vermont, United States. It was first listed as a CDP prior to the 2020 census.

It is in southwestern Bennington County, in the geographic center of the town of Pownal. U.S. Route 7 is the main road through the village, leading north  to Bennington and south  to Williamstown, Massachusetts.

References 

Populated places in Bennington County, Vermont
Census-designated places in Bennington County, Vermont
Census-designated places in Vermont